Niezgoda is a Polish placename and surname. It may refer to:

Niezgoda, Lower Silesian Voivodeship (south-west Poland)
Niezgoda, Greater Poland Voivodeship (west-central Poland)
Jarosław Niezgoda (born 1995), Polish footballer

See also
 

Polish-language surnames